The Vandergilt Diamond Mystery is a 1936 British comedy crime film directed by Randall Faye and starring Betty Astell, Bruce Seton and Hilary Pritchard. It was made at Shepperton Studios as a quota quickie.

Cast
 Betty Astell as Mary  
 Bruce Seton as Hardcastle  
 Hilary Pritchard as Briggs  
 Charles Paton as Mr. Throstle  
 Ethel Royale as Mrs. Throstle  
 Graham Soutten as The Boss  
 Billy Holland as Carponi  
 Henry B. Longhurst as Inspector Greig

References

Bibliography
 Low, Rachael. Filmmaking in 1930s Britain. George Allen & Unwin, 1985.
 Wood, Linda. British Films, 1927-1939. British Film Institute, 1986.

External links

1936 films
British crime comedy films
1930s crime comedy films
Films shot at Shepperton Studios
Films directed by Randall Faye
Quota quickies
British black-and-white films
1936 comedy films
1930s English-language films
1930s British films